American rapper and singer-songwriter Lil Nas X has released one studio album, two extended plays (EP), one mixtape and ten singles. The release of his country rap single "Old Town Road", achieved viral popularity in early 2019 and climbed the music charts internationally and became diamond certified by November of that same year. Lil Nas X released his second EP, titled 7 in 2019 through Columbia Records. Two more singles were released from the EP "Panini" and "Rodeo". His debut studio album, Montero was released in 2021 through Columbia Records. The album was preceded by the chart-topping singles "Montero (Call Me by Your Name)" and "Industry Baby", as well as "Sun Goes Down".

Studio albums

EPs

Mixtapes

Singles

Other charted songs

Music videos

Notes

References

External links
Lil Nas X official website
Lil Nas X discography at AllMusic
Lil Nas X discography at Discogs
Lil Nas X discography at MusicBrainz

Hip hop discographies
Discographies of American artists